The William Way LGBT Community Center is a nonprofit organization serving the lesbian, gay, bisexual and transgender population of Philadelphia, Pennsylvania and nearby communities, located at 1315 Spruce Street in Philadelphia in the Gayborhood.

The community center was founded in 1975 as the Gay Community Center of Philadelphia. It purchased its current building at 1315 Spruce Street in 1997, and has owned it since local businessman Mel Heifetz paid off the center's mortgage in 2005.

The center's programs include an extensive library, and programs in peer counseling, senior services, education, and arts and culture. The center also offers numerous 12-step meetings throughout the day and night. The center opened the Arcila-Adams Trans Resource Center in 2019 to centralize resources for trans people in Philadelphia. In 2021 the center collaborated with HIV/AIDS healthcare provider Philadelphia FIGHT to provide COVID-19 vaccines to LGBTQ people in Philadelphia. 

The center houses the John J. Wilcox, Jr. Archives, which collects and preserves local and regional LGBT documents and artifacts. The archive is one of the most important collections of LGBTQ documents and artifacts in the United States. Along with researchers from the ONE Archives in Los Angeles, archivists from the John J. Wilcox, Jr. Archives have been searching for unidentified men photographed at a gay wedding held in 1957. The search, which began in 2013 and is still ongoing, was covered in both LGBT and mainstream press.

The western wall of the community center features Ann Northrup's block-long mural, "Pride & Progress", featuring images of Philadelphia's LGBT citizens over decades.

Since 2010, the center's Executive Director is Chris Bartlett.

See also

 List of LGBT community centers

References

External links
 

1975 establishments in Pennsylvania
Buildings and structures in Philadelphia
LGBT community centers in the United States
LGBT culture in Philadelphia
Non-profit organizations based in Philadelphia